The 1924 Virginia Cavaliers football team represented the University of Virginia as a member of the Southern Conference (SoCon) during the 1924 college football season. Led by second-year head coach Greasy Neale, the Cavaliers compiled an overall record of 5–4 with a mark of 3–2 in conference play, tying for sixth place in the SoCon. The team played its games at Lambeth Field in Charlottesville, Virginia.

Schedule

References

Virginia
Virginia Cavaliers football seasons
Virginia Cavaliers football